Mystic is an unincorporated community in Irwin County, Georgia, United States. Mystic has a post office with ZIP code 31769, which opened on July 6, 1896. It is described as a "tight-knit community" where "everyone knows everyone", 2.5 hours south of Atlanta.

History
A post office was established at Mystic in 1896. The community was named after Mystic, Connecticut, the former home of an early settler. The Georgia General Assembly incorporated Mystic as a town in 1903. The town's municipal charter was repealed in 1995. One reference states that Mystic was the original home of Nelson Tift, founder of Albany, Georgia, but it is perhaps equally likely that the homestead was that of Henry Harding Tift, for whom nearby Tift County was named.

Mystic was struck by a tornado on December 17, 2019, which did significant damage to the community and several buildings.

References

External links
 Photos - Tornado Damage and Clean Up - Mystic, Georgia
 Library of Congress - 36 photos - Royal Family Singing Convention, Mystic, Georgia (July 17, 1977)
 Library of Congress - Audio Files and Images - Prayer and singing, Royal Tabernacle, part 4, Mystic, Georgia 

Former municipalities in Georgia (U.S. state)
Unincorporated communities in Irwin County, Georgia
Unincorporated communities in Georgia (U.S. state)
Populated places disestablished in 1995